Ryan Reaves (born January 20, 1987) is a Canadian professional ice hockey right winger for the Minnesota Wild of the National Hockey League (NHL). He has previously played for the St. Louis Blues, Pittsburgh Penguins, Vegas Golden Knights, and New York Rangers. He is the son of former gridiron football player, Willard Reaves, who played in the Canadian Football League (CFL) and National Football League (NFL).

Playing career

Youth
Reaves began playing hockey at age five and football at age eight. As a youth, Reaves played in the 2000 Quebec International Pee-Wee Hockey Tournament with the Winnipeg South Monarchs minor ice hockey team. Although he played both football and hockey growing up, after tearing his posterior cruciate ligament during a hockey tournament, he was forced to forfeit football as a sport. His torn ligament made him unable to compete in the football season prior to his Western Hockey League draft year. Reaves was eventually drafted 36th overall by the Brandon Wheat Kings in the 2002 WHL bantam draft. Despite his draft selection, Reaves continued to play for the St. John's-Ravenscourt School hockey team where he led them to the 2004 McDonald's Provincial High School Hockey Championship. Reaves joined the Wheat Kings for his rookie campaign during the 2004–05 season. Prior to the 2005–06 season, Reaves was named an alternate captain alongside Mark Derlago, Riley Day, and Derek LeBlanc.

Professional

St. Louis Blues

Reaves was drafted by the St. Louis Blues 156th overall in the 2005 NHL Entry Draft. On May 15, 2007, Reaves signed a three year entry level contract with the St. Louis Blues. At the conclusion of his major junior season, Reaves attended the Blues 2007 training camp and was reassigned to their American Hockey League affiliate, the Peoria Rivermen. While playing with the Rivermen during the 2007–08 season, he suffered an injury in a game against the Rockford IceHogs and was reassigned to the Blues ECHL affiliate, the Alaska Aces.

Reaves was recalled from the Peoria Rivermen by the Blues on October 10, 2010, after Cam Janssen suffered a concussion from a hit to the head in the Blues season opener on October 9. Reaves made his NHL debut on October 11, 2010, where he served 15 penalty minutes in the Blues' 5–1 win over the Anaheim Ducks. He was returned to Peoria after two games with the Blues as Vladimír Sobotka returned from the Injured reserve list. He later scored his first NHL goal on January 12, 2011, again against the Ducks, on goaltender Jonas Hiller.

Reaves' 2015–16	season was cut short due to a knee injury and he returned to the Blues' lineup weighing 225 instead of his usual 230. During the offseason, he trained with Blues assistant coach/video coach Sean Ferrell.

Pittsburgh Penguins
On June 23, 2017, after seven seasons with the Blues, Reaves was traded to the Pittsburgh Penguins along with a second-round pick (51st overall) in the 2017 NHL Entry Draft in exchange for Oskar Sundqvist and the Penguins' first-round pick (31st overall) in the 2017 draft. In the 2017–18 season, Reaves added muscle to the Penguins lower lines, providing 4 goals and 8 points in 58 games.

Vegas Golden Knights
On February 23, 2018, Reaves was involved in a trade with the Vegas Golden Knights. The Penguins received Tobias Lindberg from the Golden Knights in exchange for Reaves as part of a three-way trade also involving the Ottawa Senators. Reaves scored the series-winning goal over the Winnipeg Jets that qualified the Golden Knights for the 2018 Stanley Cup Finals. He also scored in Game 1 of the Stanley Cup Finals in a 6–4 Golden Knights victory, though Washington would come back and win the next four games.

On July 1, 2018, Reaves signed a two-year contract with the Golden Knights. He recorded a career-high nine goals and 20 points the subsequent season.

On June 15, 2020, the Golden Knights signed Reaves to a two-year, $3.5 million contract extension.

On May 31, 2021, Reaves was suspended for two games in the second round of the 2021 Stanley Cup playoffs for an injury on Colorado Avalanche skater Ryan Graves.

New York Rangers

On July 29, 2021, the Golden Knights traded Reaves to the New York Rangers for a 2022 third-round draft pick, and on July 31, he signed a one-year contract extension with the team.

Minnesota Wild
After going scoreless in 12 games with the Rangers to open the 2022–23 season, Reaves was traded by New York to the Minnesota Wild in exchange for a fifth-round pick in the 2025 NHL Entry Draft on November 23, 2022.

Playing style
Reaves has been described in the NHL as an enforcer, a player who is known for fighting, protecting his players and intimidating the opposition. Despite being known specifically for that role, he is often used on checking lines for aggressive forechecking sequences.

Reaves' playstyle has often led to run-ins with the NHL Department of Player Safety. He has been suspended three times during his NHL career for a total of six games (including three playoff games), and has been fined an additional three times. During the second round of the 2021 Stanley Cup playoffs, Reaves received a match penalty for attempting to injure Colorado Avalanche's Ryan Graves, after kneeling on his neck and pulling parts of his hair out. This incident resulted in a 2 game suspension from the NHL. Reaves was suspended for Game 7 of the Golden Knights' second round against the Vancouver Canucks in the 2020 Stanley Cup playoffs for an illegal hit to the head of Vancouver Canucks forward Tyler Motte, and was also suspended three games after boarding San Jose Sharks defenseman Matt Tennyson in 2016.

Personal life
Reaves is the son of Willard Reaves, a former professional football player in the Canadian Football League and National Football League. At the time of his birth in Winnipeg, his father was a member of the Winnipeg Blue Bombers. His brother Jordan Reaves is a player with the Edmonton Elks. He also has an older sister named Regina.

Reaves holds both American and Canadian citizenship.

Reaves is the great-great-great-grandson of Bass Reeves, the first black lawman west of the Mississippi River. Bass served as a deputy U.S. marshal in Fort Smith, Arkansas under the direction of judge Isaac Parker, known as the "Hanging Judge".

Career statistics

References

External links

 

1987 births
Living people
Alaska Aces (ECHL) players
Black Canadian ice hockey players
Brandon Wheat Kings players
Canadian expatriate ice hockey players in the United States
Canadian ice hockey right wingers
Canadian people of African-American descent
Minnesota Wild players
New York Rangers players
Orlando Solar Bears (ECHL) players
Peoria Rivermen (AHL) players
Pittsburgh Penguins players
Ice hockey people from Winnipeg
St. Louis Blues draft picks
St. Louis Blues players
Vegas Golden Knights players